The 2005–06 Purefoods Chunkee Giants season was the 18th season of the franchise in the Philippine Basketball Association (PBA).

Key dates
August 14: The 2005 PBA Draft took place in Sta. Lucia East Grand Mall, Cainta, Rizal.

Draft picks

Roster

Fiesta Conference

Game log

|- bgcolor="#bbffbb"
| 1
| October 2
| Red Bull
| 84-77 
| Chandler (28)
| 
| 
| Araneta Coliseum
| 1–0
|- bgcolor="#edbebf"
| 2
| October 7
| Air21
| 86–88
| Chandler (23)
|  
| 
| Ynares Center
| 1–1
|- bgcolor="#bbffbb"
| 3
| October 14
| Alaska
| 86-84 OT
| Chandler (31)
| 
| 
| Cuneta Astrodome
| 2–1
|- bgcolor="#bbffbb"
| 4
| October 16
| San Miguel
| 92-90 OT
| Chandler (26)
| 
| 
| Araneta Coliseum
| 3–1 
|- bgcolor="#bbffbb"
| 5
| October 22
| Brgy.Ginebra
| 84-78
| 
| 
| 
| Cagayan de Oro
| 4–1
|- bgcolor="#bbffbb"
| 6
| October 26
| Coca Cola
| 103-87
| Chandler (27)
| 
| 
| Araneta Coliseum
| 5–1
|- bgcolor="#edbebf"
| 7
| October 30
| Talk 'N Text
| 82–96
| J. Yap (22)
| 
| 
| Araneta Coliseum
| 5–2

|- bgcolor="#bbffbb"
| 8
| November 4
| Sta.Lucia
| 
|  
| 
| 
| Ynares Center
| 6–2
|- bgcolor="#bbffbb"
| 9
| November 9
| Coca Cola
| 
|  
| 
| 
| Araneta Coliseum
| 7–2
|-bgcolor="#bbffbb"
| 10
| November 13
| Red Bull
| 97-95
| J. Yap (23)
| 
| 
| Araneta Coliseum
| 8–2
|-bgcolor="#edbebf"
| 11
| November 16
| Brgy.Ginebra
| 
| 
| 
| 
| Araneta Coliseum
| 8–3
|-bgcolor="#bbffbb"
| 12
| November 19
| Alaska
| 78-69
| 
| 
| 
| Lucena City
| 9–3

|-bgcolor="#edbebf"
| 13
| December 7
| Talk 'N Text
| 89–93 OT
| 
| 
| 
| Ynares Center
| 9–4
|-bgcolor="#edbebf"
| 14
| December 11
| San Miguel
| 68–74
| Chandler (25)
| 
| 
| Ynares Center
| 9–5
|-bgcolor="#bbffbb"
| 15
| December 14
| Sta.Lucia
| 84-75 
| J. Yap (27)
| 
| 
| Cuneta Astrodome
| 10–5
|-bgcolor="#edbebf"
| 16
| December 18
| Air21
| 109–110
| Chandler (24)
| 
| 
| Ynares Center
| 10–6

Transactions

Pre-season

Additions

Subtractions
{| cellspacing="0"
| valign="top" |

References

Magnolia Hotshots seasons
Purefoods